Marina Tower Melbourne is a residential development in Melbourne Docklands, featuring a 43-storey inclined tower and a 36-storey inclined tower that are conjoined to the 21st floor and then diverge at five degree angles. The development also includes a seven-storey Four Points by Sheraton hotel.

See also
List of tallest buildings in Melbourne
Inclined building

References

Inclined buildings
Apartment buildings in Melbourne
Buildings and structures in the City of Melbourne (LGA)
Residential buildings completed in 2017
Skyscrapers in Melbourne
Hotels in Melbourne
Sheraton hotels